Momodou Touray (born 30 July 1999) is a Gambian-born Welsh professional footballer who plays as a forward for Warrington Rylands on loan from Marine. He is a Wales Under-21 international.

Playing career

Newport County
Touray came through the Newport County academy. In August 2017, he joined Merthyr Town on a three month loan and in January 2018 spent time on trial at Premier League club Leicester City. In April 2018 Touray signed his first professional contract with Newport County until June 2019. 

Touray made his first team debut for Newport on 5 May 2018, in a 1–1 draw against Carlisle United in the final League Two match of the season at Brunton Park as a second half substitute.

In July 2018 Touray joined Welsh Premier League side Barry Town United on loan until the end of the 2018–19 season. Touray scored 14 goals for Barry in all competitions and he was selected as the Welsh Premier League Young Player of the Year. 

On 2 August 2019 Touray joined Torquay United on a one month loan. On 2 September 2019 he returned to Barry town United on loan until the end of the 2019-20 season.

Touray was released by Newport County at the end of the 2019–20 season.

Salford City
During the summer of 2020 he trained with Salford City and appeared in a pre-season friendly for the club. It was confirmed later that he had joined the club as a member of their development squad. He made his competitive debut for the club on 9 September 2020 in a EFL Trophy game against Manchester United Under-21s.

In September 2020 he joined Marine on loan until January 2021. In August 2021, he moved on loan to National League South club Bath City until January 2022, and scored 43 minutes into his début on 15 August, scoring the opening goal in a 3–0 win against Billericay Town, but picked up an injury and was substituted after nine minutes against Tonbridge Angels the following matchday.

On 22 January 2022, Touray joined National League North side Hereford on loan for the remainder of the 2021–22 season.

He was released by Salford at the end of the 2021–22 season and then joined Marine. He went on loan to Warrington Rylands in February 2023 for a month. He left Marine in March 2023 following the conclusion of his loan spell at Rylands.

International
In October 2017 Touray scored on his debut for Wales under 19's in a 4–3 win against Switzerland. He made his debut for Wales under-21s in the Euro 2019 qualifying 3–1 win against Switzerland on 16 October 2018. In his last qualifying game age wise playing for the under 21s he scored as they beat Moldova in an UEFA U21 Euro 2021 qualifying match.

References

External links

Living people
Welsh footballers
Wales youth international footballers
Wales under-21 international footballers
Gambian footballers
British people of Gambian descent
Welsh people of African descent
Association football midfielders
Newport County A.F.C. players
1999 births
Merthyr Town F.C. players
Barry Town United F.C. players
Torquay United F.C. players
English Football League players
Cymru Premier players
Salford City F.C. players
Marine F.C. players
Bath City F.C. players
Hereford F.C. players
National League (English football) players